Electric Sea is the thirty-fifth studio album by guitarist Buckethead. It is the sequel to his 2002 release Electric Tears.

Track listing

Credits
 Produced by Buckethead and Janet Rienstra-Friesen
 Written, Composed and Arranged by Buckethead
 Production assistance by Dom Camardella
 Engineered, edited and mixed by Dom Camardella at Santa Barbara Sound Design.
 Mastered by Robert Hadley at the Mastering Lab in Ojai, CA
 Art & Design by Russell Mills
 Design assistance: Michael Webster (storm)
 Cover photograph: Breaking Ocean Wave, Baja California Sur, Mexico, by Mark A. Johnson.
Meta Support: Bella Rienstra
Made by Meta: Janet Rienstra -Friesen
Publishing: (Katella Music/BMI) all by Buckethead, except for La Gavotte and Bachethead composed by Johann Sebastian Bach and La Wally (act 1) composed by Alfredo Catalani
Buckethead thanks: My parents, Michael Jackson, Theo, Uma, Janet, and Lakshmi chicken

Notes
 "Beyond the Knowing" is an instrumental re-release of "What Kind Of Nation" from the album Intelligence Failure, a collaboration with Viggo Mortensen.
 "La Wally" is a composition by Alfredo Catalani.
 "La Gavotte" and "Bachethead" are movements (Gavotte I & II) from Suite No. 6 for solo Cello (BWV 1012) by Johann Sebastian Bach.
 "The Homing Beacon", was originally released exclusively on Buckethead's official website in 2009 without an album. It is a tribute by Buckethead to Michael Jackson after hearing the news of his death.

References

2012 albums
Buckethead albums